Erik Tammer (born 29 June 1969) is a Dutch former professional footballer who played as a striker. He is the current co-owner of USL League Two club Dayton Dutch Lions.

Playing career
Tammer played youth football with VV de Meeuwen, DSO/Ultrajectum, UVV and Ajax. He experienced his senior breakthrough at Excelsior, where he became the 1991–92 Eerste Divisie top goalscorer, and subsequently was mostly known for his stint with Heerenveen. There, he reached promotion to the Eredivisie and during the same season reached the KNVB Cup final, which was eventually lost to his former club Ajax. 

Tammer also experienced success at Go Ahead Eagles, and almost made a move to Spanish club Osasuna. The transfer did not go through in the end, as representatives of Osasuna believed that Tammer had made negative comments about the club. Tammer ended his professional career as a forward in 2001 after 322 games and 154 goals. After this, he continued playing at amateur level, where he retired as part of HBS Craeyenhout in 2010, where he was also an assistant coach in his last season due to injuries.

Retirement
After his career, Tammer founded his own sports management company. In April 2006, he founded a job site for the sports industry with a partner. The purpose of the vacancy bank was to bring former professional athletes and the business community into contact with each other.

In November 2009, Tammer became co-owner of the American association football clubs Dayton Dutch Lions and Houston Dutch Lions. He was also a scout for Heerenveen since 2013. From July 2015, he became a scout for Eredivisie club NEC. Since July 2018, he became a scout for Utrecht.

Honours

Club
Heerenveen
 Eerste Divisie play-offs: 1992–93
 KNVB Cup runner-up: 1992–93

Individual
 Eerste Divisie Golden Boot: 1991–92

References

External links
  Profile

1969 births
Living people
Dutch footballers
Dutch expatriate footballers
Association football forwards
AZ Alkmaar players
Excelsior Rotterdam players
SC Heerenveen players
Sparta Rotterdam players
Go Ahead Eagles players
ADO Den Haag players
SC Cambuur players
Eredivisie players
Eerste Divisie players
Footballers from Utrecht (city)
Expatriate footballers in Portugal
Dutch expatriate sportspeople in Portugal
Dutch expatriate sportspeople in the United States
Zwart-Wit '28 players
CVV de Jodan Boys players
HBS Craeyenhout players
UVV players
Dutch football chairmen and investors
SC Heerenveen non-playing staff
NEC Nijmegen non-playing staff
FC Utrecht non-playing staff